Qareh Malham (also known as Malham) is a village in Arshaq-e Shomali Rural District, Arshaq District, Meshgin Shahr County, Ardabil Province, Iran. During the 2006 census, its population was 24, in 4 families.

References 

Towns and villages in Meshgin Shahr County